John C. Shabaz (June 25, 1931August 31, 2012) was an American lawyer, politician, and judge. He served 30 years as a United States district judge for the Western District of Wisconsin, and was Chief Judge between 1996 and 2001. Earlier in his career, he represented Waukesha County in the Wisconsin State Assembly for 16 years as a Republican, serving as minority leader from 1973 to 1981.

Education and early career

Shabaz was born in Milwaukee, Wisconsin. He attended the University of Wisconsin–Madison as an undergraduate. He received a Bachelor of Laws from Marquette University Law School in 1957. He served in the United States Army from 1954 to 1956. He was in private practice in West Allis, Wisconsin from 1957 to 1981.

Legislative career
From 1964 to 1981, Shabaz served as a Republican state representative in the Wisconsin State Assembly, from the 83rd Assembly District, representing the Waukesha and New Berlin areas. He was the minority leader from 1973 to 1979 and served as Assistant Majority Leader in 1969.

Federal judicial service
On November 4, 1981, Shabaz was nominated by President Ronald Reagan to a seat on the United States District Court for the Western District of Wisconsin vacated by Judge James Edward Doyle. He was confirmed by the United States Senate on December 9, 1981, and received his commission on December 10, 1981. He served as Chief Judge from 1996 to 2001. He took senior status on January 20, 2009, serving in that status until his death on August 31, 2012. As of 2020, Shabaz is the last judge appointed by a Republican president to the Western District of Wisconsin.

References

Sources
 

|-

|-

|-

1931 births
2012 deaths
Judges of the United States District Court for the Western District of Wisconsin
Marquette University Law School alumni
Republican Party members of the Wisconsin State Assembly
Politicians from Milwaukee
Military personnel from Wisconsin
United States Army officers
United States district court judges appointed by Ronald Reagan
20th-century American judges
University of Wisconsin–Madison alumni